The Roman Catholic Diocese of Lwena is a diocese located in the city of Lwena in the Ecclesiastical province of Saurímo in Angola.

History
 1 July 1963: Established as Diocese of Luso from the Diocese of Silva Porto
 16 May 1979: Renamed as Diocese of Lwena
 12 April 2011: Changed suffragans from Huambo to Saurímo

Special churches
The Cathedral of the diocese is Sé Catedral de Nossa Senhora da Assunção (Cathedral of the  Assumption of Our Lady) in Lwena.

Bishops

Ordinaries, in reverse chronological order
 Bishops of Lwena (Roman rite), below
 Bishop Jesús Tirso Blanco, S.D.B. (26 November 2007  – 22 February 2022)
 Bishop Gabriel Mbilingi, C.S.Sp. (7 June 2000  – 11 December 2006), Appointed Coadjutor Archbishop of Lubango
 Bishop José Próspero da Ascensão Puaty (16 May 1979  – 7 June 2000);  see below
 Bishops of Luso (Roman rite), below
 Bishop José Próspero da Ascensão Puaty (3 February 1977  – 16 May 1979); see above
 Bishop Francisco Esteves Dias, O.S.B. (1 July 1963  – 13 April 1976)

Coadjutor bishop
Gabriel Mbilingi, C.S.Sp. (1999-2000)

Other priest of this diocese who became bishop
José Manuel Imbamba, appointed Bishop of Dundo in 2008

See also
Roman Catholicism in Angola

Sources
 GCatholic.org

Lwena
Christian organizations established in 1963
Roman Catholic dioceses and prelatures established in the 20th century
Lwena, Roman Catholic Diocese of
Roman Catholic bishops of Lwena